Bouthaina Shaaban (born 1953 in Homs, Syria) is a Syrian politician and political and media adviser to the President of Syria, Bashar al-Assad. Shaaban served as the first Minister of Expatriates for the Syrian Arab Republic, between 2002 and 2008, and has been described as the Syrian government's face to the outside world.

Life and education
Born in Masudiyah, Homs and a member of the Syrian Regional Branch of the Arab Socialist Ba'ath Party since the age of 16, she was educated in Britain and obtained her Ph.D. in English literature from the University of Warwick.
She is married to Iraqi Dr. Khalil Jawad; the couple have two daughters and a son.

Career
Shaaban worked first as an interpreter for the Syrian presidents Hafez al-Assad and Bashar al-Assad, his son. Under Hafez she became an "adviser to the Foreign Ministry," and in 2003 she was named Minister of Expatriates, "a new post created to try to lure wealthy Syrian expatriates abroad — or at least their resources — back home." In 2008, she was appointed political and media adviser to president Bashar al-Assad. Between 1985 and 2003 she was also the professor of Romantic poetry at the English department of Damascus University.

Shaaban was particularly visible in English-speaking media after the Valentine's Day 2005 assassination of former Lebanese Prime Minister Rafiq Hariri, when she participated in several television interviews and wrote several op-ed pieces attacking the United Nations probe into Syrian involvement in the murder and insisted that Israel and the United States were responsible for Hariri's assassination. In August 2011, the US sanctioned Shaaban together with other five other Syrian officials.

She is the author of Both Right and Left Handed: Arab Women Talk About Their Lives (1988), a book composed mostly of interviews with Syrian, Lebanese, Palestinian, and Algerian women. In this study, Shaaban invited Arab women to talk openly about their lives and the roles of women in their societies, how they feel they've changed through different times of war and crisis, and what they think the future holds for Arab women. Another of her books published in English is her study of Arab female writers Voices revealed: Arab women novelists, 1898-2000.

In his article of 2012, "Failing the masses: Buthaina Shabaan and the public intellectual crisis", A. Al-Saleh described her public image like this: "The shift of Shabaan from being a feminist to serving the propaganda of the regime has damaged her integrity as an intellectual."

Connections to Syrian leadership
Shaaban's rise within the Syrian government is speculated to be due to her close friendship with Bushra Al-Assad, daughter of Hafez al-Assad. Sometime in the late 1980s, Shaaban also introduced Bushra to her future husband Assef Shawkat.

During the Syrian Civil War, Shaaban mentioned in January 2020 that the Syrian economy is "50 times better than 2011", despite the deterioration of the value of the Syrian pound against U.S. dollar. Later on, she said that Syrians have no choice but "patience and steadfastness" upon the implementation of the Caesar Act.

Honors
In 2005, Shaaban was presented with "the Most Distinguished Woman in a Governmental Position" award by the Arab League.

Footnotes

Bibliography

1953 births
Living people
People from Homs
Syrian women academics
Syrian Shia Muslims
Arab Socialist Ba'ath Party – Syria Region politicians
Syrian ministers of expatriates
People of the Syrian civil war
Alumni of the University of Warwick
Academic staff of Damascus University
Women government ministers of Syria
21st-century Syrian politicians
21st-century Syrian women politicians